Western Pacific Passenger Depot is a former railway station in Sacramento, California, located at 19th and J Streets. Opened in 1910 by the Western Pacific Railroad as part of the Feather River Route, the station would go on to serve the original California Zephyr until the service was discontinued in 1970. The Old Spaghetti Factory opened in the old building in 1978.

The station building was designed by Willis Polk in the Mission Revival style.

References

Buildings and structures in Sacramento, California
Railway stations in Sacramento County, California
Transportation in Sacramento, California
Former Western Pacific Railroad stations
Railway stations in the United States opened in 1910
Railway stations closed in 1970
Former railway stations in California